Yairagi No.2 Dam  is a gravity dam located in Kumamoto Prefecture in Japan. The dam is used for water supply. The catchment area of the dam is 0.4 km2. The dam impounds about 6  ha of land when full and can store 638 thousand cubic meters of water. The construction of the dam was started on 1982 and completed in 1984.

See also
List of dams in Japan

References

Dams in Kumamoto Prefecture